Cattle Decapitation is an American deathgrind band from San Diego, California, formed in 1996. The band's current lineup includes vocalist Travis Ryan, guitarists Josh Elmore and Belisario Dimuzio, bassist Olivier Pinard, and drummer David McGraw. Cattle Decapitation have released seven albums, the most recent being Death Atlas, which was released on November 29, 2019.

History

Founded in 1996, the band started with an entirely vegan lineup. Only two current members are vegetarian, namely Travis Ryan and Josh Elmore.

The 2002 album To Serve Man saw controversy in Germany, where distribution company SPV refused to handle the album due to its graphic cover. The cover of the 2004 album Humanure, featuring a cow excreting human remains, was reportedly censored without permission from the label in some outlets. Record store owners did not display the album, making it difficult for customers to find and buy it.

Former member Gabe Serbian was a member of the band The Locust. Metal author and journalist Garry Sharpe-Young once acknowledged the band as "one of the few metal bands whose message hits as hard as their music". In August 2009, Cattle Decapitation parted ways with long-time bassist Troy Oftedal because of "musical and personal differences". Cattle Decapitation's album Monolith of Inhumanity was released in 2012. It received positive reviews upon release.

Cattle Decapitation has toured with extreme metal acts including Suffocation, Cryptopsy, The Black Dahlia Murder, Deicide, Behemoth, Hate Eternal, Krisiun and Job for a Cowboy. The band also participated in Metal Blade Record's Scion A/V Showcase in late 2012.

The band spent the majority of 2014 writing a new record. The tracking for the album was announced to have been completed on February 14, 2015. On May 20, 2015, Cattle Decapitation announced the title of the new record was The Anthropocene Extinction. Alongside this announcement the band released the first song of the record, titled "Manufactured Extinct". It was released through Metal Blade Records on August 7, 2015.

On April 30, 2018, two Native American teens were pulled out of a Colorado State University tour by the police for being "too quiet" and wearing "dark clothing." When the band found out that one of the brothers was wearing Cattle Decapitation T-shirts, they offered the brothers "free guest list spots for life."

In August 2018, the band announced the addition of Cryptopsy bass player Olivier Pinard, as well as the promotion of touring rhythm guitarist Belisario Dimuzio to being a full time member, thus making the group a five piece for the first time. The recording of the seventh studio album Death Atlas began in May 2019, and was released November 2019.

On January 10, 2023, the band announced their eighth album, Terrasite, will be released on May 12.

Lyrical themes
Cattle Decapitation's songs protest the mistreatment and consumption of animals, the abuse of the environment and touch subjects such as misanthropy and genocide of the human race. Much of the band's music is based on putting humans in the situations that animals are subjected to, for example animal testing, slaughter, etc. The band's lyrics are largely concerned with human impact on the environment, the ethics of eating meat and animal rights. 

Ryan comments: "Josh and I are what you would call "vegetarian". We've tried and tried to be as up front about that as possible but the entire media world thinks we are hardline vegan, which in turn trickled down to fans and we're just not. I've been vegan at points but I try to be as correct as possible and point blank, there's times on tour where I just don't know if what I've been given to eat has eggs or dairy in it and the road is rather unfriendly to us. We aren't afforded the luxury of going to a Whole Foods at 3 am after a show. At that point it's fucking Taco Bell or something disgusting. You're driving down the road burning fossil fuels and your vehicle is covered in the carcasses of insects and sometimes birds and other animals. So how far does one take it? This is why I can't claim vegan. I live my life with as much compassion as I can for others, the environment and the animals though. At home it's much easier."

Members 

Current
 Travis Ryan – vocals 
 Josh Elmore – lead guitar 
 Dave McGraw – drums 
 Belisario Dimuzio – rhythm guitar 
 Olivier Pinard – bass 

Former
 Dave Astor – bass , drums 
 Gabe Serbian – drums , guitars 
 Scott Miller – guitars, vocals 
 Troy Oftedal – bass 
 Michael Laughlin – drums 
 Derek Engemann – bass

Timeline

Discography

Studio albums

Compilation albums
Medium Rarities (2018)

EPs

Split albums

Demos

Music videos

References

External links

Cattle Decapitation at Metal Blade

1996 establishments in California
Deathgrind musical groups
Death metal musical groups from California
American grindcore musical groups
Metal Blade Records artists
Musical groups established in 1996
Musical groups from San Diego
Musical quintets
Political music groups
Environmental musical artists